Langley Fundamental Secondary is a public secondary school in Langley, British Columbia part of School District 35 Langley. It shares the same campus as the Langley Fundamental Middle School.

LFMSS was established in 1998 with 223 students in grades 7–9.  The program has expanded every year to its current (as of September 2017) grade 6-12 configuration with 712 students and 43 teachers.

High schools in British Columbia
Educational institutions established in 1998
1998 establishments in British Columbia